Graphic Adventure Creator (often shortened to GAC) is a game creation system/programming language for adventure games published by Incentive Software, originally written on the Amstrad CPC by Sean Ellis, and then ported to other platforms by, amongst others, Brendan Kelly (Spectrum), Dave Kirby (BBC, Electron) and "The Kid" (Malcolm Hellon) (C64). The pictures in the demo adventure, Ransom, were made by Pete James and the box cover art by Pete Carter.

GAC was available for the ZX Spectrum, Commodore 64, BBC Micro and Amstrad CPC. A simplified version without graphics, called just the Adventure Creator, was also available for the Acorn Electron. GAC was later ported to the Atari ST as ST Adventure Creator (STAC) by the original author.

GAC had a more advanced parser than The Quill, allowing commands like GET THE LAMP THEN LIGHT IT, and a built-in graphics editor. Over 300 titles were written using GAC. It also came with a built in text compressor.

Reception 
GAC was well received, earning a Zzap! Gold Medal Award.

References

External links

1985 software
Text adventure game engines
Graphic Adventure Creator, The
ZX Spectrum software